Simitidion is a genus of comb-footed spiders that was first described by J. Wunderlich in 1992.  it contains three species, native to Africa, Asia and Europe, and introduced to Canada: S. agaricographum, S. lacuna, and S. simile.

See also
 List of Theridiidae species

References

Further reading

Araneomorphae genera
Theridiidae